Golden Shower of Hits is the third studio album by American hardcore punk band Circle Jerks, released July 21, 1983 by the labels Allegiance and LAX Records. It was the band's last album to feature the band's original bassist Roger Rogerson and their only release to feature drummer John Ingram, who briefly replaced Lucky Lehrer. After the album, the band's music took a different direction on their next studio album, Wonderful (1985).

Background
The album was produced by LAX's owner, Jerry Goldstein, who had signed the band to his Far Out Management company. Goldstein was known for his work as a former member of the Strangeloves,  co-writer of the 1963 hit "My Boyfriend's Back", producer/songwriter for War and  former manager of Sly and the Family Stone.

The title track, "Golden Shower of Hits (Jerks on 45)", also released as a single, was a riff on the popular "Stars on 45" medley from 1981. It featured a medley of six cover versions ("Along Comes Mary", "Close to You", "Afternoon Delight", "Having My Baby", "Love Will Keep Us Together" and "D-I-V-O-R-C-E") strung together to create a storyline of two people who fall in love, have an unplanned pregnancy, rush into marriage, and end up divorced.

Reception

Critical reception for Golden Shower of Hits has been mostly positive. Greg Prato of AllMusic gave the album 4 out of 5 stars and claimed that "everything you love about legendary Californian punkers the Circle Jerks is gloriously displayed on Golden Shower of Hits." He added that "obnoxious humor (Keith Morris' vocals, the album cover), disjointed guitars courtesy of Greg Hetson, and sloppy yet excited rhythm work (bassist Roger Rogerson and drummer John Ingram) all add up to perhaps the ultimate punk rock party", and called Golden Shower of Hits an "ultimate introduction to this one-of-a-kind band".

Golden Shower of Hits received another positive review from Jeff Bale of Maximum Rock 'n' Roll, who claimed that the album "ranks somewhere between their great debut and its so-so follow-up, Wild in the Streets". About the album's music, Bale stated that "the songs range from vintage Jerks - short, tuneful blasts like 'In Your Eyes' and 'Coup d'Etat' - to boring mid-tempo rockish numbers (like 'When the Shit Hits the Fan' and 'Rats of Reality') that seem to be aimed at a crossover hard rock/HM audience".

In popular culture
The songs "Coup d'État" and "When the Shit Hits the Fan" were featured on the soundtrack to the 1984 Alex Cox film Repo Man. "When the Shit Hits the Fan" was re-recorded for the soundtrack, with Earl Liberty and Chuck Biscuits replacing Rogerson and Lehrer.

Track listing

Personnel
 Keith Morris - lead vocals
 Greg Hetson - guitar
 Roger Rogerson - bass
 John Ingram - drums

Production
 Jerry Goldstein - production
 Steve Barncard; Bobby Lewis; John Fishback - engineering
 Scott Hasson - assistant engineer
 Bill Inglot; Ken Perry - mastering
 Glen E. Friedman - photography
 Mike Dowd - design

References

1983 albums
Circle Jerks albums
Albums produced by Jerry Goldstein (producer)
Albums recorded at Capitol Studios